North Vista Hospital is a for-profit hospital owned and operated by Prime Healthcare Services and is the only hospital in North Las Vegas, Nevada. The hospital provides 177 beds.

History
The hospital opened in 1959 as North Las Vegas Hospital with 33 beds.  It was later renamed Community Hospital and Lake Mead Hospital Medical Center and has undergone several expansions, including construction of the west tower and Women's Plaza complex in the mid 1990s.

In 2014, its former owner IASIS Healthcare sold it to Prime Healthcare Services.

References

External links
 

1959 establishments in Nevada
Buildings and structures in North Las Vegas, Nevada
Hospital buildings completed in 1959
Catholic hospitals in North America
Hospitals established in 1959
Hospitals in the Las Vegas Valley